Paul Booker Reed was Mayor of Louisville, Kentucky from 1885 to 1887.

Biography
His father, William Decatur Reed was a lawyer and Kentucky Secretary of State under Governor William Owsley. P. Booker Reed studies at Centre College were interrupted by the Civil War, during which he served the Confederate Army for four years as a private in the Orphan Brigade and the Kentucky Ninth Infantry. After the war he attended medical school in Europe. He started a successful manufacturing business in Louisville in the 1870s.

In 1880 he was appointed to Louisville's Chancery Court, and in 1884, with the support of emerging political boss John Whallen, he was elected mayor over John W. McGee. During his three-year term he balanced the city's budget, cutting unnecessary city positions and lowering salaries, including his own.

After his term of mayor he served as president of the Board of Aldermen as a Republican from 1899 to 1900. He dropped out of the 1901 race for mayor.

He then moved west to Seattle then to Canada. He was buried in Cave Hill Cemetery in Louisville.

See also
Southern Exposition

References

External links

1842 births
1913 deaths
Burials at Cave Hill Cemetery
Confederate States Army soldiers
Kentucky state court judges
Mayors of Louisville, Kentucky
Orphan Brigade
Politicians from Frankfort, Kentucky
19th-century American judges